Pyro is an unincorporated community in Madison Township, Jackson County, Ohio, United States.

References 

Unincorporated communities in Jackson County, Ohio